"All This Time" is a song written for the winner of the second and final series of Pop Idol in the United Kingdom. The last two acts in the show, Michelle McManus and Mark Rhodes, both performed the song in the final. McManus went on to win and released "All This Time" as her debut single on 5 January 2004. The song reached number one on the UK Singles Chart on 11 January 2004 and remained there for three weeks, later being included on her debut album, The Meaning of Love. Subsequent releases failed to duplicate its success, and McManus was dropped by BMG.

Reception
BBC Music writer Ruth Mitchell described the song as "epic", with a "glorious array of lush harmonies". A Daily Record journalist called it "beautiful" and a "brilliant pop gem which is laced with a luxurious gospel feel". Ian Hyland in the Sunday Mirror unfavourably compared McManus to previous Pop Idol winner Will Young but nevertheless rated the single 7/10.

Conversely, Fiona Shepherd in The Scotsman described the track as a "tuneless dirge", while an Entertainment.ie critic labelled it "a triumph of hype over substance". Daily Telegraph critic Lynsey Hanley called the song "utterly forgettable" and "one of the lamest Pop Idol-sponsored efforts" and argued that it achieved the UK number-one position "on the back of the series' success".

Music video
The music video for "All This Time" was recorded in December 2003 and was released to UK Music Channels that same month. The video shows Michelle singing the song in front of a pure black background. The video also shows certain moments from Michelle's time in Pop Idol.

Track listing
European CD single
 "All This Time"
 "On the Radio"

Charts

Weekly charts

Year-end charts

Certifications

Cover versions
Almighty Records artist Deja Vu featuring Tasmin recorded a cover version of "All This Time".

References

19 Recordings singles
2003 debut singles
2003 songs
Bertelsmann Music Group singles
Michelle McManus songs
Number-one singles in Scotland
Song recordings produced by Steve Mac
Songs written by Ali Tennant
Songs written by Steve Mac
Songs written by Wayne Hector
UK Singles Chart number-one singles